The 2009 season was Liam Sheedy's second season in charge of the Tipperary senior hurling team. Tippeary won the Munster championship, defeating Waterford 4-14 to 2-16 in the final. They went on to reach the All-Ireland final but lost to Kilkenny 0-23 to 2-22.

2009 senior hurling management team

2009 squad
The following players made their competitive senior debut in 2009.

Patrick Maher against Waterford on 8 February.
Brendan Maher against Cork on 14 February.
Gearóid Ryan against Cork on 14 February.
Séamus Hennessy against Cork on 14 February.
Noel McGrath against Cork on 14 February.
Pádraic Maher against Dublin on 29 March.

2009 National Hurling League

2009 Munster Senior Hurling Championship

2009 All-Ireland Senior Hurling Championship

Awards
Pádraic Maher, Conor O'Mahony, Lar Corbett and Noel McGrath all won All Star Awards with McGrath also named as the Young Hurler of the Year.

References

External links
Tipperary GAA Archives 2009
2009 Teams and Results at Premierview

Tipp
Tipperary county hurling team seasons